Melisma (from , plural: melismata) is the singing of a single syllable of text while moving between several different notes in succession. Music sung in this style is referred to as melismatic, as opposed to syllabic, in which each syllable of text is matched to a single note. An informal term for melisma is a vocal run. The term roulade is also sometimes used interchangeably with melisma.

History

General
The term melisma may be used to describe music of any genre, including baroque singing, opera, and later gospel. Within the tradition of Religious Jewish music, melisma is still commonly used in the chanting of Torah, readings from the Prophets, and in the body of a service.

Today, melisma is commonly used in Middle Eastern, African, and African American music, Irish sean nós singing, and flamenco. Melisma is also commonly featured in Western popular music.

Prevalence in western popular music
The use of melisma is a common feature of artists such as Deniece Williams, Stevie Wonder, Luther Vandross, Whitney Houston, Céline Dion, Mariah Carey, Beyoncé, Christina Aguilera, among others. The use of melismatic vocals in pop music slowly grew in the 1980s. In the following two decades, melismatic vocals became the standard used to judge a singer’s skill. This is partially why singers who are proficient in this singing style consistently make the lists of best singers of all time. Deniece Williams topped the Billboard Hot 100 chart in May 1984, with "Let's Hear It for the Boy" with her melismatic vocals. Although other artists used melisma before, Houston's rendition of Dolly Parton's ballad "I Will Always Love You" pushed the technique into the mainstream in the 1990s. The trend in R&B singers is considered to have been popularized by Mariah Carey's song "Vision of Love", which was released and topped the U.S. charts in 1990, and went on to be certified gold.

As late as 2007, melismatic singers such as Leona Lewis were still scoring big hits, but around 2008–2009, this trend reverted to how it was prior to Carey, Dion and Houston's success – singers with less showy styles such as Kesha and Cheryl Cole began to outsell new releases by Carey and Christina Aguilera, ending nearly two decades of the style's dominance of pop-music vocals.

Examples

The traditional French carol tune to which the hymn "Angels We Have Heard on High" is usually sung (and "Angels from the Realms of Glory" in Great Britain), contains one of the most well known melismatic sequences in Christian hymn music. Twice in its refrain, the "o" of the word "Gloria" is held through 16 different notes.

George Frideric Handel's Messiah contains numerous examples of melisma, as in the following excerpt from the chorus "For Unto Us a Child Is Born"  (Part I, No. 12). The soprano and alto lines engage in a 57-note melisma on the word "born".

See also 
 Arabic maqam
 Roulade

References

External links 
 American Heritage Dictionary of the English Language entry on "melisma"
 Virginia Tech Multimedia Music Dictionary entry on melisma

Singing techniques
Musical terminology